Michael Niedrig (born 12 January 1980) is a German former footballer. He made his professional debut for 1. FC Köln in the 2003–04 season.

References

External links
 

1980 births
Living people
German footballers
1. FC Köln players
1. FC Köln II players
Holstein Kiel players
VfB Remscheid players
Bundesliga players
2. Bundesliga players
Association football midfielders
Footballers from Cologne